Robert G. Foster   (October 6, 1856 – June 15, 1921) was a 19th-century Major League Baseball player. He played primarily catcher during the 1884 season for the Philadelphia Keystones of the Union Association and the Philadelphia Athletics of the American Association.

Sources

1856 births
1921 deaths
19th-century baseball players
Baseball players from Philadelphia
Major League Baseball catchers
Philadelphia Keystones players
Philadelphia Athletics (AA) players